Patrick Hrabe (born April 25, 1980) is an independent artist in Redding, California and a former U.S. Navy Electronics Technician and submariner. He is the founder of Tube Daze Productions, a company that specializes in machinima, the art using engines from video games to create films. He is the creator of Hey, Shipwreck (a series about U.S. Navy submariners) and Join the Navy* (a comic about U.S. Navy recruiting). Patrick Hrabe was reported as a missing person on October 14, 2015, but has subsequently been found alive as of March 18, 2016.

References

1980 births
Living people
American illustrators
American animators